The Pashulok Barrage is a barrage located on the Ganges River just south of Rishikesh in Dehradun district, Uttarakhand, India.

Chilla Power Plant

See also

List of power stations in India

References

Dams completed in 1980
Dams in Uttarakhand
Barrages in India
Dehradun district
1980 establishments in Uttar Pradesh
Rishikesh
20th-century architecture in India